Sad Day may refer to:

"Sad Day", a 1966 song by The Rolling Stones from "19th Nervous Breakdown"
"Sad Day", a 2019 song by FKA Twigs from Magdalene
"Sad Day", a song by Blancmange